The Lone Wolf Strikes is a 1940 crime drama film directed by Sidney Salkow, which stars Warren William, Joan Perry, and Eric Blore.

The Lone Wolf character dates back to 1914, when author Louis Joseph Vance invented him for a series of books, later adapted to twenty-four Lone Wolf films (1917–1949). Warren Williams starred in nine of these films (1939–1943).

Cast list

References

External links
 
 
 

1940 crime drama films
1940 films
Films directed by Sidney Salkow
Columbia Pictures films
American crime drama films
American black-and-white films
The Lone Wolf films
1940s American films